Mount Mitchill in Atlantic Highlands, Monmouth County, New Jersey, United States, at , is the highest headland of the United States east coast south of Maine.  It has a panoramic view of Raritan Bay, New York City and Sandy Hook and is near the Twin Lights Lighthouse in Highlands. It is the location of the Monmouth County 9-11 Memorial. It was named after Samuel Latham Mitchill, who determined the height of the hill.

See also
 Todt Hill
 Raritan Bayshore

References

External links
Mt. Mitchill Scenic Overlook Park
Park Brochure (PDF)
Monmouth County 9-11 Memorial

Atlantic Highlands, New Jersey
Landforms of Monmouth County, New Jersey
Mitchell, Mount